Spencer Township is an inactive township in Pike County, in the U.S. state of Missouri.

Spencer Township was erected in 1820, taking its name from Spencer Creek.

References

Townships in Missouri
Townships in Pike County, Missouri